Herbicide Resistance Action Committee, sponsored by CropLife International
Hráč, an album by Pavol Hammel